George Aristotle Economou (June 24, 1923 – April 2, 2003) was an American optical systems expert, who helped set up special cameras to photograph and study the first test of the atomic bomb in 1945. He was instrumental in the development of the atomic bomb at Los Alamos, working on the Manhattan Project under scientific director Robert Oppenheimer.

Life
Born in 1923 in Manchester, New Hampshire, Economou built his first telescope at the age of 12. After studying astronomy and astrophysics at Harvard University, his career began at the Polaroid Corporation. In 1944, he joined the United States Army and was assigned to Los Alamos, New Mexico, where he helped conceptualize camera lenses used to photograph bomb tests.

At Contraves, he was later involved in the design of ground station optical instrumentation for GEODSS.

Economou officially retired in 1990 as Group Vice President, Optical Instruments for the Contraves Goerz Corporation in O'Hara Township, Pennsylvania, but continued to work on some of the industry's more high-profile projects, such as consulting for design and construction of the Large Millimeter Telescope. He died of lung cancer aged 79 on April 2, 2003, at Allegheny General Hospital.

Notes

References
Kelso, T.S. "Real-World Benchmarking", Satellite Times, November 1996.  Accessed August 8, 2007. (mentions Contraves as designer and manufacturer of GOEDSS during the period Mr. Economou was Group Vice President)
"FedBizOpps request citing Contraves as original developer of GEODSS"
"Obituary at Post-Gazette" April 5, 2003. (Describes Mr. Economou's involvement in the Large Millimeter Telescope project)

External links
Obituary at Post-Gazette
A story about his colleague Ben Benjamin from Los Alamos, which includes a photograph of George.

1923 births
2003 deaths
Deaths from lung cancer in Pennsylvania
Harvard College alumni
People from Manchester, New Hampshire
Manhattan Project people